Henry Morris may refer to:

Henry Morris (MP) (by 1536–1572/3), MP for Devizes
Sir Henry Morris, 1st Baronet (1844–1926), British medical doctor
 Henry Morris (1874–1945), aka Énrí Ó Muirgheasa, Irish scholar
Henry Morris (education) (1889–1961), English Education Officer who developed the Village college
Henry M. Morris (1918–2006), young earth creationist, hydrological engineer and Christian apologist; father of the creation science movement
Henry Morris (footballer) (1919–1993), Scottish international footballer

See also

Henry Maurice (disambiguation)
Henry Morris-Jones (1884–1972), Welsh doctor, soldier and politician
Harry Morris (disambiguation)